Charles I. Halt (born 1939) is a retired United States Air Force colonel and a former deputy base commander of RAF Bentwaters, near Woodbridge, Suffolk. After serving in Vietnam, Japan and Korea, he was assigned to Bentwaters as deputy commander. The Rendlesham Forest incident of late December 1980 occurred shortly afterwards, and he was an important witness to events on the second night of sightings.

Rendlesham Forest Investigation
In the late hours of December 27, and early December 28, 1980 then Lieutenant Colonel Halt led a patrol to investigate an alleged UFO landing site near the eastern edge of Rendlesham Forest. During this investigation they witnessed several unidentified lights, most prominent of them being a bright flashing light in the direction of Orford Ness as first pointed out by a local forester, Vince Thurkettle. Later in the night they witnessed bright starlike objects hovering in the sky for several hours. In January 1981 Halt composed an official Air Force memorandum listing details of the events. The memo was then dispatched to the Ministry of Defence. Halt also made an audio tape recording of the incident.

Post-military
After retiring from the US Air Force in 1991, Halt made his first public appearance in a television documentary, where he confirmed the authenticity of the Rendlesham Forest incident. In 1997 he was interviewed by Georgina Bruni for a book about the Rendlesham event, You Can't Tell the People. He has also appeared in several television documentaries, including the five listed below.

In June 2010 Halt issued a notarized affidavit in which he summarized the alleged events of the Rendlesham Forest UFO incident and concluded: "I believe the objects that I saw at close quarter were extraterrestrial in origin and that the security services of both the United States and the United Kingdom have attempted – both then and now – to subvert the significance of what occurred at Rendlesham Forest and RAF Bentwaters by the use of well-practiced methods of disinformation."

Col. Charles Irwin Halt has released a book written with John Hanson titled The Halt Perspective.

TV documentaries
 Unsolved Mysteries - Bentwaters UFO
 U.S. Sci Fi Channels "UFO Invasion at Rendlesham". - available to watch here - First broadcast December 1, 2005
U.S. History Channels "UFO Files - Britain's Roswell - available to watch here - First broadcast December 17, 2005
 Galileo Mystery - Das UFO von Rendlesham Forest (German TV show about the UFO landing in Rendlesham Forest)
 Paranormal Witness - The Rendelsham Files

References

External links
 Colonel Halt on the UFO Casebook
 Charles Halt - Guests - Coast to Coast AM.
 Rendlesham UFO Incident - Shows - Coast to Coast AM.

United States Air Force officers
Living people
1939 births